The 2017 Best of Nollywood Awards was the 9th edition of the ceremony and took place in Abeokuta, Ogun State on 17 December 2017. The event was co-hosted by Rahama Shadau and Gbenro Ajibade.

The nominee list was released in September 2017 with Omotola Jalade-Ekehinde, Mercy Aigbe, and Alex Ekubo identified as the "top contenders". About 120 films were considered including 113 feature films, 7 short films and 2 TV shows. 

Awards were given in 32 categories, with Adesua Etomi, Beverly Naya, Gabriel Afolayan and Alex Ekubo amongst the winners. The lifetime achievement awards for special contribution to the development of Nollywood was given to Omotola Jalade-Ekiende, Ali Nuhu and filmmaker, Lancelot Oduwa Imasuen.

Awards

References 

2017 in Nigerian cinema
Nollywood
2017